The macro region of Kresy denotes the Eastern historical provinces of the Kingdom of Poland and the Grand Duchy of Lithuania. In the 20th century during the Second Republic of Poland it was the term for its Eastern Borderlands. Following the "Fourth Partition of Poland", the Tehran, Yalta and Potsdam Conferences, in the wake of the Second world war, ratified the annexation of the Kresy territories by the Soviet Union. They were apportioned to Lithuania, Belarus and Ukraine where they remain. 

A number of notable or influential figures from Polish history were born in the former macro region (note: the following list does not include Poles born in the cities of Lwów (Lviv), and Wilno (Vilnius) - see List of Leopolitans, List of Vilnius-related people). 

 Jozef J. Zwislocki, physicist and neuroscientist, born in Lwów.

References

History of Poland
Lists of Polish people
Lists of Ukrainian people
Lists of Lithuanian people
Ukrainian people of Polish descent